Lhánice is a municipality and village in Třebíč District in the Vysočina Region of the Czech Republic. It has about 200 inhabitants. The Jihlava River forms the southern municipal border.

References

External links

Villages in Třebíč District